James Hubert Wilson (May 13, 1909 — July 15, 1999) was a Canadian professional ice hockey player who played two games in the National Hockey League with the New York Americans during the 1931–32 season. The rest of his career, which lasted from 1930 to 1942, was spent in various minor leagues. Wilson was born in Ottawa, Ontario in 1909 and died there in 1999.

Career statistics

Regular season and playoffs

External links
 

1909 births
1999 deaths
Ice hockey people from Ottawa
Canadian ice hockey centres
New Haven Eagles players
New York Americans players
Philadelphia Rockets players
Pittsburgh Hornets players
Providence Reds players
Quebec Castors players
Springfield Indians players